Thatching is crafting a roof with dry vegetation.

Thatch or Thach may also refer to:

 Thach (surname)
 Thach, Alabama, also known as "Thatch"
 Thach Weave, aerial combat tactic developed by naval aviator John S. Thach
 Thatch (comic strip), syndicated from 1994 to 1998
 Thatch (horse), thoroughbred racehorse, competing from 1972 to 1973
 Thatch (lawn), a layer of decaying material below the surface of a grass lawn
 A nickname for Margaret Thatcher, Prime Minister of the United Kingdom from 1979 to 1990
 A nickname for Geoffrey Boycott, English cricket player from 1962 to 1986